Denis Hollenstein (born 15 October 1989) is a Swiss professional ice hockey winger who currently plays for the ZSC Lions of the National League (NL).

Playing career
On 08 December 2015, Hollenstein was signed to a 3-year CHF 2.1 million contract extension to remain in Kloten.

On 21 November 2017, it was announced that Hollenstein would join the ZSC Lions for the 2018/19 season, despite a contract valid through the 2019/20 season with Kloten. The Lions had to pay Kloten a CHF 2 million fee to obtain Hollenstein. Meanwhile, Hollenstein's contract with the ZSC is rumored to have been increased to CHF 1 million per season. It was officially announced on 27 November 2017 that Hollenstein had agreed to a five-year contract worth CHF 5 million with the Lions. Hollenstein will make his debut with Kloten's biggest rival in September 2018.

International play
Hollenstein competed in the 2012 IIHF World Championship as a member of the Switzerland men's national ice hockey team.

Career statistics

Regular season and playoffs

International

References

External links

1989 births
Living people
EHC Bülach players
Swiss expatriate ice hockey people
Genève-Servette HC players
Guelph Storm players
HC Thurgau players
Ice hockey players at the 2014 Winter Olympics
Ice hockey players at the 2018 Winter Olympics
Ice hockey players at the 2022 Winter Olympics
EHC Kloten players
Olympic ice hockey players of Switzerland
Ice hockey people from Zürich
Swiss expatriate sportspeople in Canada
Swiss ice hockey left wingers
ZSC Lions players